Alexis Patricio Cárcamo Varela (born 3 September 1984) is a Chilean former footballer who played as an attacking midfielder. Besides Chile, he played in New Zealand.

Career
As a child, Cárcamo was with Escuela de Fútbol Bernardo O'Higgins in his city of birth. At professional level, Cárcamo played for Magallanes, Barnechea and Deportes Santa Cruz in his homeland. In addition, he played for club Los Desordenados from Rancagua and Deportes Paniahue. As a member of Deportes Paniahue, he took part in the 2010 Copa Chile Bicentenario.

In 2011, he moved to New Zealand thanks to a friend from O'Higgins and joined Onehunga Sports. In 2012, he signed with Waikato FC, later WaiBOP United, in the New Zealand top level. He also played for Hamilton Wanderers, where he coincided with his compatriot Ignacio Machuca and became the team captain, Glenfield Rovers, Tasman United and Manurewa AFC.

Personal life
At the same time he was a player, he started a football academy in New Zealand.

References

External links
 Alexis Cárcamo at FootballTransfers.com
 Alexis Cárcamo at TodoPorElFutbol.com 

1984 births
Living people
People from Rancagua
Chilean footballers
Chilean expatriate footballers
Deportes Magallanes footballers
Magallanes footballers
A.C. Barnechea footballers
Deportes Santa Cruz footballers
WaiBOP United players
Hamilton Wanderers players
Tasman United players
Manurewa AFC players
Primera B de Chile players
Tercera División de Chile players
New Zealand Football Championship players
Chilean expatriate sportspeople in New Zealand
Expatriate association footballers in New Zealand
Association football midfielders